Zhang Zhaozhong (born May 6, 1952) is a retired Chinese military theorist at the PLA National Defense University. He held the rank of rear admiral in the People's Liberation Army Navy prior to his retirement.

Earlier Life 
He was born in a small village. Due to the Cultural Revolution, he was not able to pick his profession when he was enrolled in university, and was given the major in Arabic. He later was put to work as observer of the Iran-Iraq War.

Career
A frequent commentator on state-run television outlets, Zhang is known of his successful predictions about the Gulf War and wrong predictions during the CCTV live broadcast of the Iraq War, mainly due to the overestimation of Iraqi military's will to fight and failure to completely understand the American strategy. He is also known for some of his belligerent comments to hide the real military strength of China. The best-known instance was his dramatical denial of the existence of the Chinese stealth fighter J-20 by exaggerating the American technological advantages. 

In contrast, he also sometimes expresses a low opinion of U.S. military-political will, with his 2012 assertion that the U.S. would "run like a rabbit" if China went to war with Japan over the Diaoyu Islands being an example. He also suggested that the PLAN might equip civilian fishing boats for suicide attacks against the United States Navy.

Zhaozhong is known for his CCTV commentaries where he has, among other things, said that smog is a good thing for China because it would obscure US laser weapon systems in the event of an attack 

Due to his misguided statements, Zhang Zhaozhong has become an online Internet meme. The incident has led Chinese netizens to mockingly refer to Zhang as “Chief of the Strategic Fool-You Agency.”

References 

Living people
1952 births
People's Liberation Army generals from Hebei
People's Liberation Army Navy admirals
People from Cangzhou
Military theorists